Scoparia largispinea is a moth in the family Crambidae. It was described by Wei-Chun Li, Hou-Hun Li and Matthias Nuss in 2010. It is found in the Chinese provinces of Guizhou and Henan.

The length of the forewings is 6–8 mm. The forewings are covered with blackish-brown scales. The antemedian, postmedian and subterminal lines are white. The hindwings are white.

Etymology
The species name refers to the phallus with a big apical spine in the male genitalia and is derived from Latin larg- (meaning large) and the spineus (meaning spinous).

References

Moths described in 2010
Scorparia